Wasif Ali Wasif (15 January 1929 – 18 January 1993) was a teacher, writer, poet and sufi from Pakistan.

Early life
Wasif was the son of Malik Muhammad Arif Abbasi and received his early education in Khushab before going to Jhang to study.

Education
After obtaining his bachelor's degree at Islamia College, Lahore, he studied for a master's degree in English literature. He wrote for the college magazine "Ravi".

In 1962 he established his own institute, "Lahore English College" near Anarkali in Lahore.

Books 
This is a list of Wasif's books:
 Shab Chiragh (Urdu Poetry) 1978 
 Kiran Kiran Sooraj (Aphorism) 1983
 The Beaming Soul (English Version of Kiran Kiran Sooraj) 2008
 Dil Darya Samundar (Essays) 1987
 Qatra Qatra Qulzum (Essays) 1989
 Ocean in Drop (English version Of Qatra Qatra Qulzam) 1989
 Harf Harf Haqeeqat (Essays) 1994
 Bharay Bharolay (Punjabi Poetry) 1994
 Shab Raaz (Urdu Poetry) 1994
 Baat Say Baat (Aphorism) 1995
 Gumnam Adeeb (Letters) 19??
 Mukalama (Dialogue, Speeches & Interview) 1990
 Ziker-e-Habeeb (Na'tia Poetry) 2004
 Dareechay (Aphorism) 2004
 WasifYat (Essays) 2013	
 Kulyat-e-Wasif Ali Wasif (Poetry) 2014	
 Aqwaal-e-Wasif Ali Wasif Ka Encyclopedia 2014	
 Guftgoo (Questions & Answers Series – 30 volumes)
 Guftgoo 1–5 (volume 1) 2015
 Guftgoo 6–10 (volume 2) 2015
 Guftgoo 11–15 (volume 3) 2015
 Guftgoo 16–20 (volume 4) 2015
 Guftgoo 21–25 (volume 5) 2015

References

Further notes

External links 

 Wasif Khayal Magazine
 Dailytimes.com.pk: Seminar to commemorate Wasif Ali Wasif

Hashemite people
Alids
Awan
Alvis
Pakistani Sufis
Sufi poets
1929 births
1993 deaths
Pakistani scholars
Poets from Punjab, Pakistan
People from Khushab District
20th-century Pakistani poets
20th-century Muslim scholars of Islam
Aphorists
20th-century Pakistani philosophers